Hildeberto José Morgado Pereira (born 2 March 1996) is a professional footballer who plays for Kunshan as either a winger or a right back. Born in Portugal, Pereira represents the Cape Verde national football team.

Club career

Benfica
A product of S.L. Benfica's youth system, Pereira debuted for Benfica B on 15 March 2015 in a 3–0 away win at Farense (0–3) in the Segunda Liga. He netted a brace in a victory by the same score at Porto B on 17 May.

On 22 July 2016, Pereira signed a season-long loan deal with English Championship club Nottingham Forest for the 2016–17 season. He scored his first goal for the club in a 3–1 win over Birmingham City on 14 October. Pereira was sent off on 7 November during a 1–1 draw with Queens Park Rangers, which was already his third dismissal of the season following earlier red cards away at Aston Villa on 11 September and at Blackburn Rovers on 18 October. Forest manager Philippe Montanier, was angry that his first caution was collected for dissent and confirmed that the player would be fined by the club.

When Mark Warburton was appointed as Forest manager in March 2017 for the last nine games of the season, Pereira took no further part in the campaign.

Legia Warsaw
On 10 July 2017, Pereira joined Ekstraklasa side Legia Warsaw on a four-contract with the option of a fifth. He played seven games during his time in the Polish capital, and scored twice on 28 November in a 4–2 home win (7–3 aggregate) over Bytovia Bytów in the quarter-finals of the cup.

Pereira returned to the English Football League on 3 January 2018, joining Northampton Town in League One until the end of the season. On 13 February, as a half-time substitute for Sam Foley, he was sent off in a 2–1 home loss to Gillingham.

Pereira arrived at Legia overweight because of three months without playing, and suffered an injury that ruled him out for a further three. He considered quitting football as a result.

Vitória de Setúbal 
On 2 August 2018, Pereira returned to Portugal and signed a three-year contract with Primeira Liga side Vitória de Setúbal. He scored four times in his first top-flight season, including a hat-trick on 6 October in a 4–0 home win against Moreirense FC.

Kunshan F.C.
On 6 September 2020, Pereira joined China League One side Kunshan. He would go on to establish himself as regular within the team and was part of the squad that won the division and promotion to the top tier at the end of the 2022 China League One campaign.

International career
Born in Portugal, Pereira is of Cape Verdean descent. He debuted for the Cape Verde national football team in a friendly 2–1 win over Togo on 10 October 2019.

Career statistics
.

Honours
Benfica
UEFA Youth League: Runner-up 2013–14

Kunshan
 China League One: 2022

References

External links
 
 
 
 

1996 births
Living people
Black Portuguese sportspeople
Footballers from Lisbon
Citizens of Cape Verde through descent
Cape Verdean footballers
Cape Verde international footballers
Portuguese footballers
Portugal youth international footballers
Portuguese people of Cape Verdean descent
Association football defenders
S.L. Benfica B players
Nottingham Forest F.C. players
Legia Warsaw players
Northampton Town F.C. players
Vitória F.C. players
Kunshan F.C. players
Liga Portugal 2 players
English Football League players
Ekstraklasa players
Primeira Liga players
China League One players
Cape Verdean expatriate footballers
Cape Verdean expatriate sportspeople in England
Cape Verdean expatriate sportspeople in Poland
Portuguese expatriate footballers
Portuguese expatriate sportspeople in England
Expatriate footballers in England
Portuguese expatriate sportspeople in Poland
Expatriate footballers in Poland
Portuguese expatriate sportspeople in China
Expatriate footballers in China